Battle of Najaf or Siege of Najaf may refer to several battles or sieges:

Siege of Najaf (1918)
Battle of Najaf (2003)
 Battle of Najaf (2004)
 Battle of Najaf (2007)

Najaf